Erdoğan is a village in the Kestel district of Bursa Province in Turkey. During the early years of the Ottoman Empire, the Battle of Dinboz was fought around this village between Turkish forces under Osman I and various regional Byzantine governors.

References

Villages in Kestel District